Haldórsvík, also Haldarsvík, is a village located on the north-east coast of Streymoy in the Sunda Kommuna municipality.  In the centre of the village there is a small waterfall.

The stone church in the village is from 1856.  It is the only octagonal church on the Faroe Islands.  The altarpiece is also distinctive.  It represents the Last Supper, with the Apostles' faces replaced by the faces of living public figures from the Faroe Islands.

Gallery

See also 

 List of towns in the Faroe Islands

External links 
 Faroeislands.dk: Haldarsvík - images and description of all cities on the Faroe Islands
 Haldarsvík - site about the village

References

Populated places in the Faroe Islands